Hóc Môn is a suburban district of Ho Chi Minh City, Vietnam. In 2010, the district had a population of 358,640 and an area of 109 km².

Geographical location
Hóc Môn District borders Củ Chi district to the north, Bình Dương province to the east, District 12 to the south, and Bình Chánh and Bình Tân districts to the west.

Administration
Hóc Môn District now consists of the town of Hóc Môn (thị trấn Hóc Môn) and 11 communes (xã):
Bà Điểm
Đông Thạnh
Nhị Bình
Tân Hiệp
Tân Thới Nhì 
Tân Xuân
Thới Tam Thôn
Trung Chánh
Xuân Thới Đông
Xuân Thới Sơn
Xuân Thới Thượng

History
Between 1698 and 1731, some people from the northern and central regions of Vietnam moved to Hóc Môn to escape the constant warfare between the Nguyễn and the Trịnh. At that time, this area was still undeveloped land, with wild animals including tigers roaming free. Because a great deal of taro grew in the swampy areas there, the new settlers called this place "Hóc Môn", meaning "the corner/alley with taro." In 1885 a revolt broke out at the Eighteen Betel Nut Gardens. However, in Khmer language "Hóc Môn" is spelled (by Annamese pronunciation) of "ហុកម៉ូន" (Hok-maun).

The Giồng T-road junction (ngã ba Giồng) at Hóc Môn is a road intersection where many anticolonial prisoners were executed by French firing squads, including Phan Đăng Lưu, Hà Huy Tập, Nguyễn Thị Minh Khai, Võ Văn Tần and Nguyễn Văn Cừ on 28 August 1941.

In April 1997, seven communes split to create District 12: Thạnh Lộc, An Phú Đông, Tân Thới Hiệp, Đông Hưng Thuận, Tân Thới Nhất, a piece of Tân Chánh Hiệp and a piece of Trung Mỹ Tây.

References

Further reading 
 

Districts of Ho Chi Minh City